is a Japanese professional footballer who plays as an attacking midfielder or a winger for J2 League club Shimizu S-Pulse.

Club statistics
.

References

External links

Profile at Shimizu S-Pulse

1997 births
Living people
Association football people from Yamagata Prefecture
Japanese footballers
J1 League players
J2 League players
Shonan Bellmare players
Ehime FC players
Kashiwa Reysol players
Shimizu S-Pulse players
Association football midfielders
Footballers at the 2018 Asian Games
Asian Games silver medalists for Japan
Asian Games medalists in football
Medalists at the 2018 Asian Games